Sigurd Allern (born 5 September 1946) is a Norwegian media theorist and the first professor of journalism at the University of Oslo. He was also one of the central people in starting the Workers' Communist Party of Norway in the early 1970s, and was the first chairman of the party between 1973 and 1975 and at the same time chairman of the Red Electoral Alliance. He was also editor-in-chief of Klassekampen from 1969 to 1970, and again from 1979 to 1995.

References

1946 births
Living people
Workers' Communist Party (Norway) politicians
Norwegian educators
Norwegian newspaper editors
Academic staff of the University of Oslo
Leaders of political parties in Norway
Klassekampen editors